Abdul Jabar (born 1975) was a captive who survived the Qala-i-Jangi prison riot.

An article published in the New York Times described Abdul Jabar as a 26-year-old citizen of Uzbekistan, from Tashkent.

Abdul Jabar told the New York Times that he had been in Afghanistan's north for approximately a year prior to al Qaeda's attacks on America on September 11, 2001.  He said he had been working in Kabul working with the Islamic Movement of Uzbekistan—part of a group of 150 Uzbeks.

Jabar added that the uprising was a reaction to the Afghan Northern Alliance not honoring assurances it had made that foreigners who surrendered their weapons without resistance would be set free.  He said the leader of his group, Juma Namangani, had led the uprising:

The Guardian reported that Namangani had been killed in combat prior to the group's surrender.

Jabar estimated that there had been approximately 400 prisoners prior to the uprising.  Only 85 captives survived.  
Jabar described hiding from Northern Alliance bombardment in ditches and trenches, and then crawling from the prison's courtyard to the basement.  Authorities tried bombarding the building with cannon fire, with rocket fire.  On November 29, 2001, authorities tried flooding the basement with burning fuel.  He told the New York Times:

On December 1, 2001, Northern Alliance Commander Din Muhammad diverted irrigation canals to flood the basement:

The New York Times reported that survivors of the riot were loaded into industrial shipping containers, in order to be transported to a more secure facility.

It also stated that Abdul Jabar feared for his life if he were repatriated to Uzbekistan:

The Guardian reported that Jabar denounced al Qaeda's attacks on 9-11, and said the fighters had no grudge with the USA:

He was interrogated by Luke Harding, whom he told that "It was our commander who began the fighting", presumed to be a reference to Tahir Uldosh, who was believed to  be killed in the uprising.

There is no record that Abdul Jabar was sent to the Guantanamo Bay detention camps, in Cuba.

References

1975 births
Living people
Uzbekistani extrajudicial prisoners of the United States
Uzbekistani expatriates in Afghanistan